The Finnish Apostolic Lutheran Church in Brown County, South Dakota was built in 1884. It was added to the National Register of Historic Places in 1984.

It served Finnish immigrants, "which in east central South Dakota came primarily from Oulu Province or far northern Finland. This was the area in which the Apostolic movement had its beginnings and greatest popularity in Finland."

See also
Greasewood Finnish Apostolic Lutheran Church, Oregon, also NRHP-listed

References

Finnish-American culture in South Dakota
Lutheran churches in South Dakota
Churches on the National Register of Historic Places in South Dakota
Churches completed in 1884
Churches in Brown County, South Dakota
National Register of Historic Places in Brown County, South Dakota